{{DISPLAYTITLE:C6H6O3}}
The molecular formula C6H6O3 may refer to:

 Hydroxymethylfurfural
 Hydroxyquinol
 Isomaltol
 Levoglucosenone
 Maltol
 Phloroglucinol
 Pyrogallol
 Triacetic acid lactone